Avan may refer to:

Films 
 Aah (film), a 1953 Hindi-language film dubbed into Tamil as Avan
 Avan (1985 film), a 1985 Tamil-language film
 Avan (2010 film), a 2010 Malayalam-language film

Places 
 Avan, Armenia, a village in Armenia
 Avan District, a district in Yerevan, Armenia
 Avan, East Azerbaijan, a village in Iran
 Avan, Qazvin, a village in Iran
 Avan, Sweden
 Avan, Russia, a former village in Providensky District, Chukotka Autonomous Okrug

Other uses 
 Aban or Avan, a Zoroastrian term for water
 Fatih Avan (born 1989), Turkish javelin thrower
 Avan Jogia (born 1992), Canadian actor

See also 
 Awan (disambiguation)
 Avon (disambiguation)